Parklands is an eastern suburb of Mandurah.

References

Suburbs of Mandurah